The Université Hospital of Lyon (HCL) was created on January 18, 1802. It is the second Teaching hospital in France. It has 13 hospitals in the Lyon area and one in the south of France.

References

Teaching hospitals in France
Hospitals established in 1802